Disepalum plagioneurum (synonym Polyalthia pingpienensis) is a species of plant in the Annonaceae family. It is found in China, Laos and Vietnam.

References

Annonaceae
Flora of China
Taxonomy articles created by Polbot